Raj Bharath Swaminathan (born 20 November 1994) is an Indian professional race car driver who raced in the Formula 2000 MRF Challenge 2014.

Career
Raj started his motorsport career with karting in 2008, winning the ‘Most promising rookie of the year’ trophy in his debut year, in the National Karting Championship. After winning the Rotax Max Karting National Champion title in 2010, he progressed to the JK Racing Asia Series in 2011, followed by the Formula Pilota China in 2012 and the Formula Masters China in 2013, where he achieved a single win. He won the Young Star Driver program from Mercedes-Benz India in 2014. In 2012, Bharath became a part of the Aston Martin Racing Driver Academy. In the 2014–15 MRF Challenge Formula 2000 Championship Raj achieved four podiums including one win and finished third overall.

Racing record

MRF Challenge Formula 2000 Championship results

Formula Masters China results

Formula Pilota China results

JK Racing Asia Series 2011 Results

References

External links

 
 

1994 births
Living people
Indian racing drivers
Formula Masters China drivers
MRF Challenge Formula 2000 Championship drivers